Martin Schöffmann (born 31 March 1987, in Leoben) is an Austrian racing cyclist who last rode for . He is in a relationship with Nathalie Birli.

Palmares

2008
 1st  Under-23 National Road Race Championships
2009
 1st  Under-23 National Road Race Championships
 1st  National Hillclimb Championships
 2nd National Race Championships
 8th Eschborn-Frankfurt City Loop U23
2011
 1st Grand Prix Betonexpressz 2000
2012
 2nd Overall Oberösterreichrundfahrt
 9th Ljubljana–Zagreb
2014
 10th Raiffeisen Grand Prix

References

1987 births
Living people
Austrian male cyclists
People from Leoben
Sportspeople from Styria